Seven clubs represented Thailand at various times in the AFC Asian Club Championship, a football competition which took place each year 1967–71 and 1985–2002. The most successful Thai club was Bangkok Bank F.C., which qualified nine times.

Participation 

A total of seven clubs represented Thailand in the AFC Asian Club Championship, which became defunct in 2002.

W : Winner

Thai club statistics

Bangkok Bank

Results

BEC Tero Sasana

Results

Royal Thai Police

Results

Port Authority of Thailand

Results

Royal Thai Air Force

Results

Sinthana

Results

Thai Farmers Bank

Results

Overall statistics

By club

See also 
 Asian Club Championship
 Thai clubs in the AFC Champions League
 Thai clubs in the AFC Cup
 Thai football records and statistics

 Asian Club Championship
Thai football clubs in international competitions